Alois Samec (born 12 February 1906, date of death unknown) was a Czech wrestler. He competed for Czechoslovakia in the men's freestyle welterweight at the 1936 Summer Olympics.

References

External links
 
 

1906 births
Year of death missing
Czech male sport wrestlers
Olympic wrestlers of Czechoslovakia
Wrestlers at the 1936 Summer Olympics
Place of birth missing